Friedrich Wilhelm Ludwig Grützmacher (1 March 1832 – 23 February 1903) was a noted German cellist and composer in the second half of the 19th century. He composed mostly for cello (including several concertos and many technical studies), but also wrote orchestral pieces, chamber music, piano music and songs.

Life
Grützmacher was born in Dessau, Anhalt, and was first taught by his father. Soon he began studying cello with Dotzauer's pupil, Karl Drexler (1800–1873).

In 1848, he was discovered in Leipzig by the famous violinist, Ferdinand David, who arranged some concerts for him. In 1850, he became solo cellist in the Leipzig theatre orchestra, the Gewandhaus Concerts, and professor at the Leipzig Conservatory. He played in the David String Quartet.

In 1860, Grützmacher moved to Dresden to be principal cellist of the court orchestra, and head of the Dresden Musical Society. In 1877, he became a professor at the Dresden Conservatory. He concertized all over Europe and Imperial Russia, where he became a friend of the famous cellist Karl Davydov. He played the first performance of Richard Strauss's Don Quixote in Cologne in 1898. He was the teacher of Wilhelm Fitzenhagen and Hugo Becker whose editions are still used.

Grützmacher is most famous today for taking samples of four different works to form his edition of Luigi Boccherini's Concerto in B-flat, still being published and performed. He is also known for rearranging J. S. Bach's Cello Suites with additional chords, passages and embellishments. His cadenzas for the cello concertos by Boccherini and Joseph Haydn are often performed to this day. He made frequent tours throughout Europe and Russia as a solo cellist and chamber musician.

Sources
 Grutzmacher short Biography
 

1832 births
1903 deaths
19th-century classical composers
19th-century German musicians
Composers for cello
German classical cellists
German Romantic composers
People from Anhalt-Dessau
People from Dessau-Roßlau
20th-century cellists